Haaparannan sanomat ('Haparanda News') was a Finnish-language twice-weekly liberal newspaper published from Haparanda, Sweden, between 1916 and 1917. It was linked to the Swedish-language newspaper Haparanda Nyheter. Arwi Hällfors was the editor of the newspaper.

References

1916 establishments in Sweden
1917 disestablishments in Sweden
Defunct newspapers published in Sweden
Finnish-language newspapers
Newspapers published in Sweden
Publications established in 1916
Publications disestablished in 1917